Douy may refer to:

People
  (born 1975), French rugby player
  (1924–2010), French art director
 Max Douy (1913–2007), French art director
  (born 1941), French art director

Places
 Douy, Eure-et-Loir, France
 Douy-la-Ramée, France